The economy of China refers to the economy of the People's Republic of China (mainland China).

Economy of China may also refer to:
 Economic history of China
 Economic history of China (1912–1949) (Republic of China on the mainland)
 Economic history of China (1949–present) (People's Republic of China) 
 Economic of the Special Administrative Regions of China
 Economy of Hong Kong
 Economy of Macau
 Economy of Taiwan (Republic of China on Taiwan after 1949)